Rémi sans famille is a 2018 French adventure-drama-historical film directed by Antoine Blossier. The story is based on the French author Hector Malot's novel Sans Famille.

Synopsis

The beginning of the film takes place in an orphanage on a stormy night. The terrified children are gathered on an old man, who tells a story about his childhood, and the man's name is Rémi. Rémi is a young boy found abandoned at a church as a baby. The boy grew up happily with his mother, but difficulties came when his father had an accident and was sued. Rémi was tried to be taken to an orphanage by his father when they met with a former violinist named Vitalis, a street performer with a monkey, Lovely Heart (Joli-Coeur in original French), and a dog, Capi. Vitalis discovered Rémi's singing talent and offered to "rent" the boy to escape the orphanage. Their adventure begins...

Cast

References

External links 
 
 Rémi sans famille (Mars Films)
 Rémi sans famille (Unifrance)